Pterognathiidae is a family of worms belonging to the order Filospermoidea.

Genera:
 Cosmognathia Sterrer, 1991
 Pterognathia Sterrer, 1966

References

Gnathostomulida
Platyzoa families